Aqua Planet is a water park at the Clark Freeport Zone in Pampanga, Philippines. It is the largest water park in the Philippines.

Background
Aqua Planet is a water park located in the northwest portion of the Clark Freeport Zone, which is mostly in Mabalacat, Pampanga. It cost  to build. The water park is a joint venture of BB International Leisure and Resort Development Corporation (BBI), Eaglesky Technology Amusement and Gaming, and Central Summit International.

History

Development
Filipino-Taiwanese firm BB International Leisure and Resort Development Corporation (BBI) was given the rights to develop  of land in Clark, part of which was later developed into Aqua Planet. The waterpark was designed by Taiwanese architects and engineers, including a professor from Harvard University.

Construction and opening
The groundbreaking ceremony for Aqua Planet was held on October 5, 2013 and was projected to be operational by December 2016. The water park first became operational on November 23, 2017, receiving a three-day soft opening and lighting ceremony. Aqua Planet had its commercial opening on February 24, 2018.

Facilities
Aqua Planet has a daily guest capacity of up to 5,000 people with its 38 water slides and other attractions. It also hosts two wave pools; one for children and another for adults. The attractions were designed and developed by the Aquatic Development Group.

References

External links
 Aqua Planet on YouTube

Buildings and structures in Mabalacat
Water parks in the Philippines
Clark Freeport Zone
Tourist attractions in Pampanga